Gyrohypnus is a genus of beetles belonging to the family Staphylinidae.

The genus was first described by William Elford Leach in 1819.

The genus has cosmopolitan distribution.

Species:
 Gyrohypnus angustatus
 Gyrohypnus atratus
 Gyrohypnus fracticornis
 Gyrohypnus punctulatus

References

Staphylininae
Staphylinidae genera